Where's Sally? is a 1936 British comedy film, directed by Arthur B. Woods and starring Chili Bouchier, Gene Gerrard and Claude Hulbert.  The film was a quota quickie production and is now believed to be lost.

Plot
A womanising playboy becomes tired of his philandering lifestyle and asks his current girlfriend to marry him.  At the wedding reception, his best man makes a speech treating the entire gathering to the finer details of the bridegroom's chequered romantic history.  The bride becomes upset, and her new husband is furious with his best friend for being so indiscreet.  He whisks her straight out of the wedding hall and they set off on honeymoon.

Matters are set for a series of farcical complications and misunderstandings as they start to meet a motley selection of odd characters who do nothing to improve relations between the newly-weds.  Then the best friend's wife turns up at the honeymoon location, announcing that she has left her husband in disgust.  He is quickly on the scene trying to change her mind, and soon there are two sets of bickering couples going full steam, while the bridegroom and his best friend also clash with each other.  The bewildered bride has to try to make up her mind whether or not to stay with her new husband.

Cast
 Chili Bouchier as Sonia
 Gene Gerrard as Jimmy Findlay
 Claude Hulbert as Tony Chivers
 Reginald Purdell as Dick Burgess
 Renee Gadd as Sally
 Violet Farebrother as Mrs. Hickory
 Athole Stewart as Lord Mullion
 Morland Graham as Polkinholme

References

External links 
 
 Where's Sally? at BFI Film & TV Database

1936 films
1936 comedy films
British comedy films
Lost British films
Films directed by Arthur B. Woods
British black-and-white films
Lost comedy films
1936 lost films
1930s English-language films
1930s British films